Yuxarı Qaramanlı (also, Yukhary Garamanly) is a village and municipality in the Neftchala District of Azerbaijan. It has a population of 2,737. The municipality consists of the villages of Yukhary Garamanly, Ikinji Garaly, and Pirappa.

References 

Populated places in Neftchala District